Mark Johnson (born December 27, 1945) is an American producer. Johnson won the Academy Award for Best Picture for producing the 1988 film Rain Man.

Early life
Johnson was born in Washington, D.C., the son of Dorothy (née King), a realtor, and Emery Johnson, who worked in the air cargo business. He graduated from the University of Virginia in 1971.

Career
Johnson first became involved in show business in 1965, as an actor playing the sheriff's deputy in the Spanish "Spaghetti Western" Brandy, directed by Jose Luis Borau. He spent ten years of his youth in Spain, where he worked as a movie extra in films such as Franklin Schaffner's Nicholas and Alexandra and David Lean's Dr. Zhivago. His early experiences led to small acting roles in the European western Ride and Kill and the 1964 drama The Thin Red Line. After earning an undergraduate degree in Drama from the University of Virginia and an MA in Film Scholarship from the University of Iowa, Johnson moved to New York. There he entered the Director's Guild training program. One of his first projects was Paul Mazursky's autobiographical drama Next Stop, Greenwich Village. Johnson relocated to Los Angeles and worked as an assistant director on such projects as Movie Movie, The Brink's Job, Escape from Alcatraz and Mel Brooks's High Anxiety, which was co-written by future business partner Barry Levinson.

As part of Baltimore Pictures, his partnership with Levinson, Johnson produced all of the writer-director's films from 1982–1994. In addition to Rain Man, their diverse slate of features includes Good Morning, Vietnam, The Natural, Tin Men, Toys, Young Sherlock Holmes, Avalon, Diner (their 1982 debut project, for which Levinson's screenplay garnered an Oscar nomination) and Bugsy, which was nominated for ten Academy Awards, including Best Picture and Best Director. Bugsy also captured a Best Picture Golden Globe Award.

In 1994, Johnson established his own independent production company, Gran Via Productions, and won the Los Angeles Film Critics New Generation Award for his very first effort; A Little Princess, directed by Alfonso Cuarón. Under his new banner, Johnson produced the comedy Home Fries, written by Vince Gilligan and starring Drew Barrymore, and the dramatic thriller Donnie Brasco, starring Al Pacino and Johnny Depp. Gilligan won a screenwriting competition of which Johnson was a judge, subsequently had two of his screenplays produced by Johnson, Home Fries and Wilder Napalm. Johnson would later serve as a producer for Gilligan's television series Breaking Bad. He also served as executive producer for CBS-TV's L.A. Doctors and Falcone, and for the hit drama The Guardian.

Johnson's recent slate of motion pictures includes The Alamo and The Rookie, both directed by John Lee Hancock; The Banger Sisters, with Susan Sarandon and Goldie Hawn; Brad Silberling's drama Moonlight Mile, with Sarandon and Dustin Hoffman; Tom Shadyac's supernatural thriller Dragonfly, with Kevin Costner and Kathy Bates; Levinson's Irish satire An Everlasting Piece; Robert Zemeckis's spooky thriller What Lies Beneath, starring Harrison Ford and Michelle Pfeiffer; the hit comedy Galaxy Quest, with Tim Allen, Alan Rickman and Sigourney Weaver; and My Dog Skip, the acclaimed family drama (co-produced with John Lee Hancock) starring Frankie Muniz, Diane Lane and Kevin Bacon.

In recent years, Johnson produced Nick Cassavetes's drama The Notebook, The Wendell Baker Story, which marked the directorial debuts of brothers Luke and Andrew Wilson, and How to Eat Fried Worms.

Johnson has either presented or executive produced Luis Llosa's directorial debut, Sniper, Tim Robbins's directorial debut, Bob Roberts, Steven Soderbergh's Kafka, Robert Redford's Oscar-nominated Quiz Show and Journey of Hope, winner of the 1999 Foreign Language Academy Award. Recent projects include The Hunting Party, starring Richard Gere, Lake City, starring Sissy Spacek, Ballast, the critically acclaimed debut of director Lance Hammer, and My Sister's Keeper, starring Cameron Diaz, Alec Baldwin and Abigail Breslin. He is working with Guillermo del Toro to produce the movie adaption of David Moody's novel Hater.

In 2005, Johnson produced The Chronicles of Narnia: The Lion, the Witch and the Wardrobe, directed by Andrew Adamson and starring Tilda Swinton. The film was nominated for three Academy Awards and three BAFTAs, winning one of each. In 2008 he produced a sequel, Prince Caspian. The third film in the Narnia series, The Voyage of the Dawn Treader, directed by Michael Apted, was released December 10, 2010.

Johnson released three feature films in 2012: Not Fade Away, written and directed by The Sopranos creator David Chase and starring James Gandolfini, Chasing Mavericks directed by Curtis Hanson and starring Gerard Butler, and Won't Back Down starring Viola Davis, Maggie Gyllenhaal and Holly Hunter. He produced the 2015 thriller Secret in Their Eyes starring Julia Roberts, Nicole Kidman and Chiwetel Ejiofor.

Johnson was an executive producer on AMC's Emmy Award-winning series Breaking Bad. He was an executive producer on the Sundance Channel original series Rectify, and AMC's Breaking Bad spinoff, Better Call Saul. In 2019 he produced El Camino: A Breaking Bad Movie for Netflix. In 2021, he produced the thriller The Little Things starring Denzel Washington, Rami Malek and Jared Leto, written and directed by John Lee Hancock. In 2021 he executive produced the AMC+ series adaptation of Anne Rice's Interview with a Vampire. In late 2022 it was announced that Johnson is venturing into his first-ever Spanish-language series, a Church scandal drama, “Amen” (a working title).

Johnson is a member of the Board of Governors of the Academy of Motion Picture Arts and Sciences (Producers Branch).

Filmography
He was a producer in all films unless otherwise noted.

Film

Assistant director

As an actor

Miscellaneous crew

Thanks
 Suture (1993)
 Downloading Nancy (2008)
 No Saints for Sinners (2011)
 Santorini Blue (2013)

Television

Thanks
 Cyborgs Universe (2020)

References

External links
Mark Johnson Biography(Link broken) – Yahoo Movies

1945 births
American film producers
Living people
Producers who won the Best Picture Academy Award
People from Washington, D.C.
University of Virginia alumni
Golden Globe Award-winning producers
American television producers